Sonny Curtis (born May 9, 1937) is an American singer and songwriter. Known for his collaborations with Buddy Holly, he was a member of the Crickets and continued with the band after Holly's death. Curtis's best known compositions include "Walk Right Back", a major hit in 1961 for the Everly Brothers; "I Fought the Law", notably covered by the Bobby Fuller Four and the Clash; and "Love is All Around," the theme song for The Mary Tyler Moore Show.

Overview
Curtis was born in Meadow, Texas, United States. As a guitarist, he played on some of Buddy Holly's earlier 1956 Decca sessions, including the minor hit "Blue Days Black Nights" and a song he wrote, "Rock Around With Ollie Vee". In 1955 and 1956 he, along with Buddy Holly, opened concerts for rising new star Elvis Presley. Although he had gone on the road with other musicians by the time Buddy Holly put together the Crickets in 1957, Curtis joined the Crickets in late 1958, shortly before Holly's death in 1959, and soon took over the lead vocalist role in addition to lead guitar.  The Crickets' post-Holly recordings were put on hold after Holly's death, and Curtis was drafted in late 1959.  During basic training, he was given a three-day pass and met Crickets' drummer Jerry Allison, who was then playing with the Everly Brothers, in Los Angeles. Curtis played him the song "Walk Right Back", which Allison had him immediately take to the Everlys; they recorded the song that weekend and were later rewarded with a Billboard top 10 hit. The song was also a hit in 1978 for Anne Murray.

In late 1960, the Crickets' album In Style with the Crickets was finally released, including the original versions of two of Curtis's best known compositions, "I Fought the Law" and "More Than I Can Say" (co-written with Allison and a UK 4# hit by Bobby Vee and a US 2# hit by Leo Sayer). Along with Allison, he participated in Eddie Cochran's last recording sessions, including the song "Three Steps to Heaven." In 1964, he released the single "A Beatle I Want to Be". He has continued to record and perform intermittently as part of the band over six decades, most recently in their album The Crickets and their Buddies (2004), where they reprised most of their hits with help from many noted fellow musicians.  Curtis did leave the Crickets several times to pursue his solo career, but even during those periods made occasional guest appearances, in performance and on record, with the Crickets. His song "The Real Buddy Holly Story" was written in response to the inaccuracies in the movie The Buddy Holly Story.

"I Fought the Law" was later covered in the studio or in concert by many artists, including The Bobby Fuller Four, the Clash, Dead Kennedys, Bryan Adams, John Cougar Mellencamp, Bruce Springsteen, Roy Orbison, Tom Petty, Social Distortion, Mike Ness, Hank Williams Jr., Waylon Jennings, the Nitty Gritty Dirt Band, the Hoodoo Rhythm Devils, Green Day, the Ramones, the Grateful Dead, Stray Cats, Mary's Danish, Mano Negra, the Big Dirty Band, Lolita No.18, the Brian Jonestown Massacre, Attaque 77, Die Toten Hosen, Status Quo, Nanci Griffith, and the Men They Couldn't Hang. For the 2003 film, Intermission, Colin Farrell recorded a version of the song, singing it in the guise of his character in the film.

Later, Curtis wrote the theme song of The Mary Tyler Moore Show, "Love Is All Around", which he also recorded for the show. Curtis also co-wrote the 1989 Country Song of the Year, "I'm No Stranger to the Rain", recorded by Keith Whitley. Other songs he has written include "The Straight Life" (recorded by Glen Campbell, and later by Bobby Goldsboro) and "A Fool Never Learns" (recorded by Andy Williams). Anne Murray also recorded the Sonny Curtis songs "I Like Your Music" and "You Made My Life a Song" on her 1972 LP Annie.

In 1991, Sonny Curtis was inducted into the Nashville Songwriters Hall of Fame. In 2007, Curtis was inducted into the Musicians Hall of Fame and Museum in Nashville, Tennessee, as a member of the Crickets. In 2012, Curtis was inducted into the Rock and Roll Hall of Fame as a member of the Crickets (along with Allison, bassist Joe B. Mauldin, and rhythm guitarist Niki Sullivan) by a special committee, to make amends for the Crickets having been rebuffed and not included with Buddy Holly when Holly was first inducted in 1986.

Discography

Albums
{| class="wikitable"
! Year
! Album
! US Country
! Label
|-
| 1964
| Beatle Hits Flamenco Style Guitar
|
| El Records
|-
| 1968
| The 1st of Sonny Curtis
| align="center"| 21
| Viva
|-
| 1969
| The Sonny Curtis Style
| 
| rowspan="4"| Elektra
|-
| 1979
| Sonny Curtis
| 
|-
| 1980
| Love Is All Around
| 
|-
| 1981
| Rollin'''
| 
|-
| 1987
| Spectrum| 
| Nightlite
|-
| 2007
| Sonny Curtis|
|
|}

Singles
{| class="wikitable"
! rowspan="2"| Year 
! rowspan="2"| Single 
! colspan="2"| Chart Positions
! rowspan="2"| Album
|-
! width="50"| US Country
! width="50"| US
|-1964
| rowspan="2"| 1966
| "My Way of Life"b/w "Last Call"
| align="center"| 49
| align="center"| 134
| rowspan="3"| The 1st of Sonny Curtis|-
| "Destiny's Child"b/w "The Collector"
| align="center"| —
| align="center"| —
|-
| 1967
| "I Wanna Go Bummin' Around"b/w "I'm a Gypsy Man"
| align="center"| 50
| align="center"| —
|-
| rowspan="2"| 1968
| "Atlanta Georgia Stray"b/w "Day Drinker"
| align="center"| 36
| align="center"| 120
| rowspan="2"| The Sonny Curtis Style|-
| "The Straight Life"b/w "How Little Men Care"
| align="center"| 45
| align="center"| —
|-
| 1970
| "Love Is All Around"b/w "Here, There and Everywhere"
| align="center"| —
| align="center"| —
| rowspan="1"| single only
|-
| rowspan="2"| 1971
| "Day Gig"b/w "Holiday for Clowns"
| align="center"| —
| align="center"| —
| rowspan="2"| The Sonny Curtis Style|-
| "Hung Up in Your Eyes"b/w "Girl of the North"
| align="center"| —
| align="center"| —
|-
| 1972
| "Lights of L.A."b/w "Sunny Mornin'"
| align="center"| —
| align="center"| —
| rowspan="6"| singles only
|-
| 1973
| "Rock'n Roll (I Gave You the Best Years of My Life)"b/w "My Momma Sure Left Me Some Good Old Days"
| align="center"| —
| align="center"| —
|-
| 1974
| "Unsaintly Judy"b/w "You Don't Belong in This Place"
| align="center"| —
| align="center"| —
|-
| 1975
| "Lovesick Blues"b/w "It's Only a Question of Time"
| align="center"| 78
| align="center"| —
|-
| rowspan="2"| 1976
| "Where's Patricia Now"b/w "It's Only a Question of Time"
| align="center"| —
| align="center"| —
|-
| "Where's Patricia Now"b/w "When It's Just You and Me"
| align="center"| —
| align="center"| —
|-
| 1979
| "The Cowboy Singer"b/w "Cheatin' Clouds"
| align="center"| 77
| align="center"| —
| rowspan="2"| Sonny Curtis|-
| rowspan="4"| 1980
| "Do You Remember Roll Over Beethoven"b/w "Walk Right Back"
| align="center"| 86
| align="center"| —
|-
| "The Real Buddy Holly Story"Ab/w "Ain't Nobody Honest"
| align="center"| 38
| align="center"| —
| rowspan="3"| Love Is All Around|-
| "Love Is All Around"b/w "The Clone Song"
| align="center"| 29
| align="center"| —
|-
| "You Made My Life a Song"b/w "50 Ways to Leave Your Lover"
| align="center"| 70
| align="center"| —
|-
| rowspan="2"| 1981
| "Good Ol' Girls"b/w "So Used to Loving You"
| align="center"| 15
| align="center"| —
| rowspan="2"| Rollin'|-
| "Married Women"b/w "I Live Your Music"
| align="center"| 33
| align="center"| —
|-
| 1985
| "I Think I'm in Love"b/w "There's a Whole Lot Less to Me Than Meets the Eye"
| align="center"| —
| align="center"| —
| rowspan="2"| singles only
|-
| 1986
| "Now I've Got a Heart of Gold"
| align="center"| 69
| align="center"| —
|}
A"The Real Buddy Holly Story" also peaked at No. 20 on the RPM'' Country Tracks chart in Canada.

References

External links
Official website

Interview with Sonny Curtis in International Songwriters Association's "Songwriter Magazine", outlining his career up to 1995
Sonny Curtis Interview – NAMM Oral History Library (2016)

1937 births
American country singer-songwriters
The Crickets members
Living people
21st-century American singers
20th-century American singers
People from Terry County, Texas
People from Lubbock, Texas
Imperial Records artists
Liberty Records artists
Singer-songwriters from Texas
Lubbock High School alumni